The 2021–22 Pakistan Women's One Day Cup was a 50-over women's cricket competition that took place in Pakistan in September 2021. It was the first edition of the competition under its new name, and saw the addition of a new team, PCB Strikers. All matches took place in Karachi, at the National Stadium and the Pakistan Cricket Board Academy Ground.

PCB Challengers beat defending champions PCB Blasters in the final by 68 runs to claim their first one-day title. PCB Strikers beat PCB Dynamites in the third place play-off.

Competition format
The four teams played in a double round-robin group, playing each other team twice. The top two teams in the group advanced to the final, whilst third and fourth played in the third place play-off. Matches were played using a 50 over format.

The group worked on a points system with positions within the group being based on the total points. Points were awarded as follows:

Win: 2 points. 
Tie: 1 point. 
Loss: 0 points.
No Result/Abandoned: 1 point. 

If points in the final table were equal, teams were separated by most wins, then fewest loses, then Net Run Rate.

Squads
The squads for the four teams were announced by the Pakistan Cricket Board on 5 September 2021.

Points table

Source: Pakistan Cricket Board

Fixtures

Group stage

Third place play-off

Final

Statistics

Most runs

Source: CricketArchive

Most wickets

Source: CricketArchive

References

Pakistan Women's One Day Cup
Pakistan Women's One Day Cup
Pakistan Women's One Day Cup